"Summer of '69" is a song recorded by the Canadian singer Bryan Adams from his fourth album, Reckless. It is an up-tempo rock song about a dilemma between settling down or trying to become a rock star. The track was written by Adams and his longtime songwriting collaborator Jim Vallance. "Summer of '69" was produced by Adams and Bob Clearmountain. "Summer of '69" was released in June 1985 under A&M Records as the fourth single from Reckless. According to later claims by Adams, the title is a reference to the sex position, not the year, but Vallance disputes this.

The song was released with two B-side tracks: "Kids Wanna Rock" and "The Best Was Yet to Come", which had previously appeared on the albums Reckless and Cuts Like a Knife respectively. "Summer of '69" received favourable reviews from music critics. The music video for the song, which was filmed by Steve Barron, features Adams and his backing band in a variety of settings, including running from the police. The single had a strong effect on music charts internationally; in the UK it was acclaimed as one of Adams’s best, with its highest peaks being number four in the Netherlands and number five in the United States. Amongst songs recorded by Canadian artists, it is the most streamed and most digitally purchased song within Canada amongst songs originally released before the start of the digital download era (approximately 2005). It is also the most played song on Canadian radio amongst songs by Canadian artists originally released before 1990.

Conception and themes
After a tour supporting his album Cuts Like a Knife, Adams immediately started the recording sessions for the new album, Reckless. "Summer of '69" was finished on January 25, 1984, co-written with Jim Vallance in his basement studio. The song went through a number of changes because neither Adams nor Vallance was convinced it was a strong enough song to be featured on the album. In their first draft, the lyric "summer of '69" appeared only once. At that time the two were planning to title it "Best Days of My Life" instead. While the phrase "Best Days of My Life" appeared seven times in the first draft, on the final draft it had been replaced by "Summer of '69" and appeared only two times throughout the song.

When writing the lyrics "Jimmy quit, Jody got married", Vallance suggested using "Woody quit and Gordy got married", referring to members of his high school band, but Adams liked his version better. Adams mentioned once in an interview that "Jimmy" was one of his early drummers. "Jody" is a reference to Adams' sound manager, Jody Perpick, who got married during the album's recording session.

On the song's first demo, it started with a 12-string riff, just like the breakdown section in the middle of the song, but this was replaced with a chunky 6-string intro on the second demo. The song was recorded three to four times, in different ways, with both Adams and Vallance still not convinced that it was finished.

"Summer of '69" is written in the key of D major.

When Adams appeared on The Early Show in 2008, he was asked about "Summer of '69" and its lyrical meaning. Adams said the song was not about the summer of 1969 but about having sex in the summertime; "69" being a reference to the sexual position 69. Vallance, however, has gone for the more conventional interpretation of the title being a reference to a year. He notes Jackson Browne's "Running on Empty", which contains references to 1965 and 1969, as his own influence, and recalls Adams citing the film Summer of '42 as his.  However, Vallance stated on the Song Facts message board that "When we recorded the demo in my basement, towards the end of the song Bryan sang a little naughty bit: 'me and my baby in a ’69'. We had a laugh about it at the time, and Bryan decided to keep it when he did the final recording a month or two later."

That song is 35 years old now so it's had that many years to incubate. A lot of songs, like that one, hit big in America but really not anywhere else. It didn't chart anywhere in Europe until at least 10 years after it was released. [...] I think songs can have a life of their own regardless of the promotion.

Critical reception
Cash Box said of the single that it "recalls the sound and arrangement of Springsteen with Adams’ own streamlined sheen."

In its 2005 list "The 500 Greatest Songs Since You Were Born", Blender ranked the song 70th and commented that the song "made people who hadn't yet had either a first love or a first band nostalgic for the experience".

"Summer of '69" has found itself in several "best of" lists compiled by various music publications and critics, including the following:

Chart performance 

Upon the release of the album Reckless in November 1984, "Summer of '69" received some airplay on album-oriented rock radio stations but was mostly overshadowed by the tracks "Run to You" and "It's Only Love", only managing to reach number 40 on Billboards Top Rock Tracks chart.  After it was released as a single in June 1985, "Summer of '69" climbed to number 5 on the Billboard Hot 100 and helped push Reckless to the number one position on the Billboard 200 album chart in August 1985. Like the previous single released from Reckless, "Heaven", "Summer of '69" was a commercial success worldwide. On the UK Singles Chart, "Summer of '69" debuted at number fifty-nine, and managed to climb up the chart, and two weeks later reached its peak position of 42, on August 24, 1985. The single remained on the country's chart for four consecutive weeks from August to September 1985, before falling out of the top 100. The track debuted at number twenty-two on September 22, and peaked at number seven in the fifth week on the New Zealand Singles Chart. The song debuted at 95 on the Canadian RPM Singles Chart on June 29, 1985, jumping to fifty in its second week and peaking at eleven on September 14, 1985, after spending seven weeks on the chart.

The song debuted at its peak position, number 9, on August 10, on the Norwegian Singles Chart and stayed there for another four weeks before falling off the charts. "Summer of '69" charted on the Swedish Singles Chart for five consecutive weeks. Having debuted at number twenty on December 13, and peaked at number thirteen two weeks later. The single spent another three weeks on the chart before falling off. The track peaked at number seventeen on the Austrian Singles Chart, and remained on the country's chart for five weeks. The single's most commercially successful charting territory was the Netherlands, where it peaked at number 4 on September 22, 1990. The single's least successful chart territory was Germany. Having peaked on the country's singles chart at number sixty-two, the single spent the next five weeks fluctuating down the chart.

In 1985 the song won the BMI (Broadcast Music Inc.) Citation of Achievement for US radio airplay, the following year 1986 – Procan Award (Performing Rights Organization of Canada) for Canadian radio airplay and in 2000 it won a Socan Classics Award for more than 100,000 Canadian radio performances. In a poll conducted by Decima Research in 2006, "Summer of '69" was voted the best driving song among Canadians who sing in their cars. The song topped the survey with both sexes, and with French and English-speaking Canadians. In 2010, the song was voted the "hottest summer song" in Germany. In another poll, this time by Canadian magazine Chart, "Summer of '69" was voted the fourth best song of all time in 2000; four years earlier it had been voted the twenty-fourth best song of all time. The song was ranked No. 17 on CBC Radio's 50 Tracks: The Canadian Version. In 2008, the song was voted the 87th best-song of all time by radio listeners in Norway, becoming the second highest Adams song ranked, the highest being "(Everything I Do) I Do It for You" from 1991. It was voted the fourth best song ever on Radio 2, a Belgian radio station, in 2008.

"Summer of '69" remains popular to this day in many countries around the world. Adams sang "Summer of '69" during the 2011 Cricket World Cup opening ceremony in Bangladesh. More recently Adams performed a duet version of "Summer of '69" with Taylor Swift during her Reputation Tour in Toronto, Canada.

As of 2017, "Summer of '69" was, at number 115, the only song from 1995 or earlier among the 150 most streamed songs of all time in Canada by Canadian artists. As of 2017, it was the 41st highest selling digital song of all time by a Canadian artist in Canada and the highest selling such song from before 2005. Between 1996 and 2017, it was the 53rd most played song by a Canadian artist on Canadian radio stations of all format types, the only song before 1990 in the top 150 most played songs.

In May 2021 the Official Charts Company included it in the list of huge selling summer songs in the UK.

Music video
The music video, released in 1985, was directed by Irish director Steve Barron. In 1985 the music video was nominated for an MTV Video Music Award in the category for Best Male Video. While the song did not win the award, it was one of the four nominated songs from Adams' fourth studio album Reckless. The video includes appearances by Lysette Anthony and Garwin Sanford.

Track listing and formats
 7" single'
 "Summer of '69" - 3:36
 "The Best Was Yet to Come" - 2:52

Personnel 
 Bryan Adams – vocals and rhythm guitar
 Keith Scott – lead guitar
 Tommy Mandel – synthesizer and organ
 Dave Taylor – bass 	
 Pat Steward – drums
 Jim Vallance – tambourine

Charts

Weekly charts

Year-end charts

Decade-end charts

Certifications and sales

Notes

References 

Fiction set in 1969
1984 songs
1985 singles
Canadian pop rock songs
Music videos directed by Steve Barron
Bryan Adams songs
Songs written by Jim Vallance
Songs written by Bryan Adams
A&M Records singles
Song recordings produced by Bob Clearmountain
Songs about nostalgia